The Bharatiya Nritya Kala Mandir (meaning Indian Dance Arts Temple) is an arts and crafts museum and a multi-purpose cultural centre located in Patna, in the capital of Bihar, India.

History
The foundation stone for the institution of art was laid on 8 December 1950. Established by Padmashri Hari Uppal, a master in Manipuri and Kathakali dance forms, it was officially opened in 1963.

Overview
The building contains dance and drama studios, a gallery space, and an art museum. The programme of performances ranges from theatre, to live music, comedy, dance, visual art, spoken word and children's events. 

The art museum showcases a wide range of elements of antiquity. The items on display include terracotta, jewelry, metal objects, stone sculptures, stone tools, pottery, musical instruments, wooden palki, textiles and masks dated between 500 B.C. and A.D. 500. The dance instructors teach Odissi, Bharatnatyam, Kathak, folk dance, etc.

See also
 Kalidas Rangalaya

References

Theatres in Patna
Art museums and galleries in India
Museums established in 1963
Tourist attractions in Patna
1963 establishments in Bihar
Museums in Patna
Arts organisations based in India